Bonnyrigg is a suburb of Sydney, in the state of New South Wales, Australia 36 kilometres west of the Sydney central business district, in the local government area of the City of Fairfield. It is part of the Greater Western Sydney region.

History
Bonnyrigg takes its name from Bonnyrigg, Midlothian, Scotland.  In 1803, Governor King Arthur Philip granted land for the building of an orphanage. A two-storey Georgian house was erected in Brown Road and became the Male Orphan Schoolchildren's Residence. It was extended around 1914 and is now listed on the Register of the National Estate.

Heritage listings 
Bonnyrigg has a number of heritage-listed sites, including:
 Cartwright Street: Bonnyrigg House
 Lot 1 Cartwright Street: Male Orphan School land

Location

Bonnyrigg lies approximately 30 kilometres west of Sydney's central business district as the crow flies and about 36 kilometres by road. Its closest major regional centre is Liverpool. The suburb is shaped like a diamond. The suburbs of Mount Pritchard and Cabramatta West lie to the east on the other side of Green Valley Creek. St Johns Park, Greenfield Park and Edensor Park lie to the north. Bonnyrigg Heights, Hinchinbrook and Green Valley are to the west. Busby and Heckenberg lie to the south.

Currently the town centre is undergoing a major regeneration through a new housing scheme - Newleaf Bonnyrigg. This will replace over 800 dwellings with 2,330 new homes that will see the town's population increase by over 3,000 people over 12 years to 2022. The project is being delivered through a Public Private Partnership with Housing New South Wales called Newleaf.

Commercial area

Bonnyrigg's commercial area consists of a main hub around Bonnyrigg Plaza, a shopping centre located on Bonnyrigg Avenue. Bonnyrigg Plaza has undergone major renovation allowing new stores and a fresh new food court to come in. This commercial area also has several community facilities such as a PCYC, an office of the Housing NSW department and a public library. A Bunnings hardware store is located opposite to the plaza and the local primary school is adjacent to Bonnyrigg Plaza.

Brown Road in Bonnyrigg is also a commercial area, albeit smaller. It contains several mixed business Asian stores, a Vietnamese and Chinese restaurant and take away, newsagency and Liberty petrol station.

Transport

The closest train station is Cabramatta, on the Inner West & Leppington Line and Bankstown Line. There are bus links to Cabramatta Station and other nearby stations.

Bonnyrigg is served by several bus routes operated by Transit Systems Sydney. The Liverpool to Parramatta T-way transitway service, the T80, operates via Bonnyrigg, stopping near Bonnyrigg Plaza.

Demographics
According to the 2016 census of population, there were 8,670 residents in Bonnyrigg. 21.9% of people only spoke English at home. Other languages spoken at home included Vietnamese 29.4%, Khmer 6.2%, Arabic 5.1%, Cantonese 4.7% and Assyrian Neo-Aramaic 4.3%.

The most common ancestries in Bonnyrigg were Vietnamese 25.0%, Chinese 13.1%, Australian 7.1%, Khmer (Cambodian) 6.3% and English 6.0%.

41.1% of people were born in Australia. The next most common countries of birth were Vietnam 19.9%, Cambodia 5.4%, Iraq 5.2%, Laos 2.6% and China (excludes SARs and Taiwan) 1.8%.

The most common responses for religion were Buddhism 30.6%, Catholic 24.2%, No Religion 13.5%, Not stated 8.1% and Eastern Orthodox 4.3%.

Education
Bonnyrigg High School
Bonnyrigg Public School
Our Lady of Mt Carmel Parish School
Bonnyrigg Heights Public School

Sport

Soccer
Bonnyrigg is home to the New South Wales Premier League soccer club  Bonnyrigg White Eagles Football Club.

Bonnyrigg is also home to the Nineveh Soccer Stadium, home of the Fairfield Bulls football club.

References

 Fairfield City Council - The local council website profile for Bonnyrigg.

External links
 New Leaf Bonnyrigg

Suburbs of Sydney
City of Fairfield